Rohtas Goel (born 4 September 1962) is the founder of Omaxe Limited, a real estate developer based in New Delhi, India.

Biography

Rohtas Goel was born on 4 September 1962 in Hassanpur, a town in Palwal district in the Indian state of Haryana.

He is a first generation entrepreneur and  civil engineer who started his professional career with a private construction firm, but later founded Omaxe to undertake a construction and contracting business in 1987. In 1989, the company was incorporated as Omaxe Builders Private Ltd. and subsequently in 1999; it became a ‘Limited Company’. Under the leadership of Goel, Omaxe made its inroads into the evolving real estate sector in 2001. It soon launched several group housing projects at Noida and subsequently launched its first township, the NRI City at Greater Noida. The company came out with its initial public offering (IPO), which got over-subscribed by 70 times, in 2007.

Goel was featured in the Forbes list of India's richest at 48th number.

References

1962 births
Living people
Indian chief executives
Indian billionaires
People from Palwal district
People from New Delhi
Indian real estate businesspeople
20th-century Indian businesspeople
Businesspeople from Haryana
Real estate and property developers